A respiratory pressure meter measures the maximum inspiratory and expiratory pressures that a patient can generate at either the mouth (MIP and MEP) or inspiratory pressure a patient can generate through their nose via a sniff manoeuvre (SNIP). These measurements require patient cooperation and are known as volitional tests of respiratory muscle strength. Handheld devices displaying the measurement achieved in cmH2O and the pressure trace created, allow quick patient testing away from the traditional pulmonary laboratory and are useful for ward based, out patient, and preoperative assessment as well as for use by pulmonologists and physiotherapists.

The principal advantage of volitional tests is that they give an estimate of inspiratory or expiratory muscle strength, are simple to perform, and are well tolerated by patients.

Causes of respiratory muscle impairment 
Impairment of (inspiratory and expiratory) respiratory muscles is a common clinical finding, not only in patients with neuromuscular disease but also in patients with primary disease of the lung parenchyma or airways.

Patients with neuromuscular, or metabolic diseases are at risk to develop skeletal and respiratory muscle weakness. In neuromuscular diseases close attention should be paid to the involvement of both the inspiratory and the expiratory muscles. In patients with multiple sclerosis for example, abdominal (and hence expiratory) muscle weakness is a hallmark of the disease, and is related to clinical problems, such as mucus retention. In lung diseases, such as cystic fibrosis and COPD, inspiratory muscle weakness is often present. When patients are malnourished or exposed to corticosteroids, weakness of the respiratory muscles is also seen in these diseases.

Measuring respiratory muscle strength is a long established, method of assessing the mechanics of breathing. Respiratory muscle dysfunction (i.e. reduced strength or endurance) is to be distinguished from lung function abnormalities and should be measured separately. Measurement of respiratory muscle function is important in the diagnosis of respiratory muscle disease, or respiratory muscle dysfunction. It may also be helpful in the assessment of the impact of chronic diseases or their treatment on the respiratory muscles.

Types of tests performed

Maximal inspiratory pressure (MIP), also called PImax 

Maximal inspiratory pressure (MIP) MIP, also known as negative inspiratory force (NIF), is the maximum pressure that can be generated against an occluded airway beginning at functional residual capacity (FRC). It is a marker of respiratory muscle function and strength. Represented by centimeters of water pressure (cmH2O) and measured with a manometer. Maximum inspiratory pressure is an important and noninvasive index of diaphragm strength and an independent tool for diagnosing many illnesses. Typical maximum inspiratory pressures in adult males can be estimated from the equation, MIP = 142 - (1.03 x Age) cmH2O, where age is in years.

This test is performed at RV (Residual Volume) patient exhales fully in preparation for performing the test and then inhales as hard and as fast as possible with maximal sustained effort for longer than 1 second, the inhaled pressure is the highest achieved over 1 second average.

Maximal expiratory pressure (MEP), also called PEmax 

Performed at TLC (total lung capacity) patient inhales fully in preparation for performing the test and then exhales as hard and as fast as possible with maximal sustained effort for longer than 1 second, the exhaled pressure is the highest achieved over a 1-second average.

Sniff nasal inspiratory pressure (SNIP) 

Short, sharp voluntary inspiratory manoeuvre through one or both unoccluded nostrils. The tests are performed at FRC (functional residual capacity) – end of tidal expiration. The measurement recorded is the peak pressure. This test appears particularly suited to neuromuscular weakness because it obviates the use of a mouthpiece and because it is easily mastered by the vast majority of patients.

References 

Pulmonary function testing
Respiratory physiology
Respiratory therapy